Gene Edward Cronin (born November 20, 1933) is a former American football defensive end in the National Football League for the Detroit Lions, Washington Redskins, and Dallas Cowboys. He played college football at the University of the Pacific.

Early years
Cronin attended Ione High School in California. He transferred to C. K. McClatchy High School after his freshman season. He practiced football and basketball.

In 1952, he enrolled at Sacramento City College. In 1953, he transferred to the University of the Pacific. He played in the 1956 East–West Shrine Game.

In 1984, he was inducted into the Pacific Athletics Hall of Fame. In 2001, he was inducted into the Sacramento City College Hall of Fame.

Professional career

Detroit Lions
Cronin was selected by the Detroit Lions in the seventh round (74th overall) of the 1956 NFL Draft. He initially made the team as a pass rushing specialist. In 1957, he contributed to the team winning the NFL Championship.

Dallas Cowboys
Cronin was selected by the Dallas Cowboys in the 1960 NFL Expansion Draft. He became one of the first starters at outside linebacker in franchise history (the other was Wayne Hansen).

On July 30, 1961, he was traded to the Washington Redskins in exchange for a draft choice.

Washington Redskins
Cronin played two seasons for the Washington Redskins. On August 26, 1963, he was placed on the injured reserve list with a back injury and was assigned scouting duties. He only missed one game in seven seasons in the league.

Personal life
After he retired, he worked as the Detroit Lions' chief scout. In 1965, he became the first person hired by the newly formed Atlanta Falcons and served as the Director of player personnel. He was later promoted to assistant general manager, before on resigning November 15, 1968.

References

External links
Successful professional career linked to experience at McClatchy High

1933 births
Living people
People from Spalding, Nebraska
American football defensive ends
Players of American football from Sacramento, California
Sacramento City Panthers football players
Pacific Tigers football players
Detroit Lions players
Dallas Cowboys players
Washington Redskins players
Washington Redskins scouts
Detroit Lions scouts
Detroit Lions executives
Atlanta Falcons scouts
Atlanta Falcons executives